Pelorocephalus (meaning "monstrous head" in Greek) is an extinct genus of chigutisaurid temnospondyls from the Late Triassic (Carnian) Cacheutá Formation of the Cuyo Basin and the Ischigualasto Formation of the Ischigualasto-Villa Unión Basin, both in northwestern Argentina. Three species are currently recognized: the type species P. mendozensis, which was named in 1944, P. tenax, which was named in 1949 as a species of Chigutisaurus and reassigned to Pelorocephalus in 1999, and P. cacheutensis, which was named in 1953 as another species of Chigutisaurus and reassigned to Pelorocephalus along with P. tenax. A fourth species, P. ischigualastensis, was named in 1975 after the formation it was found in. The species P. tunuyanensis was named in 1948 but has since been synonymized with P. mendozensis.

References 

Chigutisaurids
Carnian genera
Triassic temnospondyls of South America
Late Triassic animals of South America
Triassic Argentina
Fossils of Argentina
Ischigualasto Formation
Fossil taxa described in 1944
Taxa named by Ángel Cabrera